Spyridon Karaiskakis (1825 – 1899) was a Hellenic Army officer and politician, the son of Georgios Karaiskakis.

Early life
He was born in 1825 at Kalamos on the island of Ithaca, as the son of Georgios Karaiskakis, one of the chief leaders of the Greek War of Independence, and Engolpia Skylodimou. In 1833, King Otto of Greece sent sixty orphaned children of War of Independence fighters, Karaiskakis among them, to be educated at Munich. Karaiskakis returned to Greece after a year, and attended a Greek high school.

Military and political career
After graduation, he entered the Hellenic Army Academy in 1842. In 1846, he participated in an insurrection at the Academy, resulting in his expulsion. Nevertheless, in 1849 he enlisted in the Mountain Guard as a second lieutenant. 

In 1854, during the Crimean War, Karaiskakis left his post in the Hellenic Army and crossed into Ottoman territory to take part in the anti-Ottoman uprising in Epirus, leading the siege of Arta by the rebels. After the revolt was suppressed, he returned to Greece. He was promoted to lieutenant and scored some success in anti-brigand operations, before being appointed aide-de-camp to King Otto in 1856. He was promoted to captain in 1859. When Otto was overthrown in 1862, Karaiskakis followed him into exile to Munich.

After the election of King George I, he returned to Greece, and in 1864 he was elected as head of the Athens National Guard. In the 1865 elections, he was elected to the Hellenic Parliament for the Valtos Province, serving until 1868. In the 1875 elections he was again elected an MP for Evrytania, which he held until he resigned his seat in 1884. During this time, he served as Minister for Military Affairs under Alexandros Koumoundouros in 1875, and Charilaos Trikoupis in 1878, 1880, and 1882.

After his resignation in 1884, he was appointed garrison commander of Corfu, with the rank of colonel. In 1888, he was appointed commander of the III Army Headquarters in Arta.

He retired from service on 13 November 1896 (O.S.), with the rank of lieutenant general.

Family
In 1860, he married the only daughter of Georgios Varvakis (son of the wealthy merchant and benefactor Ioannis Varvakis). The couple had a son, .

References 

1825 births
1899 deaths
19th-century Greek military personnel
19th-century Greek politicians
Greek MPs 1865–1868
Greek MPs 1875–1879
Greek MPs 1879–1881
Greek MPs 1881–1885
Hellenic Army lieutenant generals
Ministers of Military Affairs of Greece
People from Ithaca
Commons category link is on Wikidata